This is a list of events in Scottish television from 1957.

Events

January to July
No events.

August
16 August – The Rosemarkie transmitting station is switched on, bringing television to Inverness and north east Scotland.
 30 August – BBC Scotland launches a weekday five-minute news bulletin and a Saturday teatime sports round-up.
31 August – Central Scotland's ITV franchise Scottish Television goes on air.

September
18 September – Scottish launches a sports programme called Sports Desk, which was soon renamed Scotsport. By the time it ended in 2008 it was recognised as the world's longest-running sports television magazine.
24 September – The ITV Schools service, broadcasting programmes for schools and colleges, goes on air.

October
No events.

November
No events.

December
25 December – The Royal Christmas Message is first televised with a message from Elizabeth II.

Unknown
Construction of the Black Hill transmitting station in North Lanarkshire by the Independent Television Authority allows Scotland to receive the ITV service.

Debuts

STV
18 September – Scotsport (1957–2008)

Births
16 June - Ian Buchanan, actor
8 August - Ewan Stewart, actor

See also
1957 in Scotland

References

 
Television in Scotland by year
1950s in Scottish television